Kunstraub (German for "Art Theft") is the eleventh album by the German folk metal band In Extremo. It was released on 27 September 2013 by Vertigo Records.

Track listing 

Bonus tracks

References 

2013 albums
In Extremo albums
Vertigo Records albums